Thomas Joseph McGoldrick (20 September 1929 – 14 January 2018) was an English footballer.

Life and career
McGoldrick was born in Doncaster, England. He played for Maltby Main, Rotherham United and Chesterfield. McGoldrick died in Convoy, County Donegal in Ireland in January 2018 at the age of 88.

References

1929 births
2018 deaths
Association football forwards
Chesterfield F.C. players
English footballers
Footballers from Doncaster
Maltby Main F.C. players
Rotherham United F.C. players